is a Japanese actor. His on-screen acting debut was in the drama 「ボクの就職」 (Boku no Syūshoku) in 1994, after winning a modeling contest. He regularly appears in commercials.

Filmography

TV series
 Boku no Shūshoku/My First Job (TBS, 1994), Sanshirō Sasaki
 Tokyo Daigaku Monogatari/Tokyo University Love Story (TV Asahi, 1994), Kōichi Asakura
 Hoshi no Kinka/Heaven's Coins (NTV, 1995) – Takumi Nagai
 Mada Koi wa Hajimaranai/Love Has Yet to Come/Love Still Hasn't Begun (Fuji TV, 1995)
 Long Vacation (Fuji TV, 1996), Shinji Hayama
 Zoku Hoshi no Kinka/Heaven's Coins 2 (NTV, 1996), Takumi Nagai
 Risō no Kekkon/An Ideal Marriage/Wedding Story (TBS, 1997), Tsutomu Otaki
 Beach Boys (Fuji TV, 1997), Kaito Suzuki
 With Love (Fuji TV, 1998), Takashi Hasegawa
 Seikimatsu no Uta/The Last Song (NTV, 1998), Itaru Noa
 Kōri no Sekai/Inanimate World/The World of Ice (Fuji TV, 1999), Eiki Hirokawa
 Manatsu no Merry Christmas/Merry Christmas in Summer (TBS, 2000)
 Dekichatta Kekkon/Shotgun Marriage/Shotgun Wedding (Fuji TV, 2001), Ryūnosuke Hirao
 Toshiie to Matsu: Kaga Hyakumangoku Monogatari/Toshiie and Matsu: Love Shines Through (NHK, 2002), Yoshiyuki Sawaki
 Psycho Doctor (NTV, 2002), Kyōsuke Kai
 Time Limit (TBS, 2003)
 Yankee Bokō ni Kaeru/Drop-out Teacher Returns to School (TBS, 2003), Yoshimori Masaya
 Ruten no Ōhi: Saigo no Kōtei/Princess Hiro / China's Last Princess (TV Asahi, 2003), Aishinkakura Fuketsu
 Rikon Bengoshi (Fuji TV, 2004), Yoshiyuki Hirosawa(Guest in episode 1)
 Ningen no Shōmei/Proof of the Man (Fuji TV, 2004), Kōichirō Munesue
 Ruri no Shima (NTV, 2005), Tatsuya Kawashima/Makoto Takahara
 Rondo/Dance Music/Yeonmogok (TBS, 2006), Shō Nishijima/Takumi Kanayama
 Kazoku: Tsuma no Fuzai, Otto no Sonzai (TV Asahi, 2006), Ryōhei Kamikawa
 Tomorrow: Hi wa Mata Noboru (TBS, 2008), Kōhei Moriyama
 Boss (Fuji TV, 2009), Shinjirō Nodate
 Fumō Chitai (Fuji TV, 2009–2010), Shinichirō Hyōdō
 Nagareboshi (Fuji TV, 2010), Kengo Okada
 Boss 2 (Fuji TV, 2011), Shinjirō Nodate
 Mō Ichido Kimi ni, Propose (TBS, 2012), Haru Miyamoto
 Olympic no Minoshirokin (TV Asahi, 2013), Masao Ochiai
 Suteki na Sen Taxi (KTV, 2014), Edawakare
 Blues of Stepmother and Daughter (TBS, 2019), Ryōichi Miyamoto
 Idaten (NHK, 2019), Hyozo Omori
 Ichikei's Crow: The Criminal Court Judges (Fuji TV, 2021), Michio Iruma
 The Days (Netflix, 2023)

Films
 Calmi Cuori Appassionati (2001), Junsei Agata
 Best Wishes for Tomorrow (2008)
 Ano Sora o Oboeteru/Wenny Has Wings (2008)
 The Hovering Blade (2009), Takashi Oribe
 Taiheiyō no Kiseki: Fokksu to Yobareta Otoko (trans. Miracle of the Pacific: The Man Called Fox ; English title: Oba: The Last Samurai) (2011), Captain Ōba Sakae
 A Honeymoon in Hell: Mr. and Mrs. Oki's Fabulous Trip (2011), Nobuyoshi Ōki
 The Apology King (2013), Masaomi Minowa
 The Tale of Nishino (2014), Yukihiko Nishino
 Jinsei no Yakusoku (2016), Yūma Nakahara
 Shin Godzilla (2016), Hideki Akasaka
 The Last Recipe (2017), Miyake
 Birds Without Names (2017), Shun'ichi Kurosaki
 The Blood of Wolves (2018), Kōsuke Nozaki
 Talking the Picture (2019)
 Shin Ultraman (2022), Government official
 Six Singing Women (2023), Kayashima
 Ichikei's Crow: The Movie (2023), Michio Iruma
Life of Mariko in Kabukicho (2023), Masaya

Dubbing
 The Little Prince (2015), the Snake

References

External links
 Yutaka Takenouchi Official website
 Asian online
 

Japanese male television actors
1971 births
Living people
Japanese male film actors
Japanese male models
20th-century Japanese male actors
21st-century Japanese male actors
Ken-On artists